

NVC community CG6 (Avenula pubescens grassland) is one of the calcicolous grassland communities in the British National Vegetation Classification system. It is one of four communities of rank, tussocky grassland associated with low levels of grazing, within the lowland calcicolous grassland group.

It is a comparatively widely distributed community. There are two subcommunities.

Community composition

The following constant species are found in this community:
 Meadow Oat-grass (Avenula pratensis)
 Downy Oat-grass (Avenula pubescens)
 Red Fescue (Festuca rubra)
 Common Bird's-foot-trefoil (Lotus corniculatus)
 Dandelion (Taraxacum officinale agg.)
 Neat Feather-moss Pseudoscleropodium purum

No rare species are associated with this community.

Distribution

This community is found in lowland limestone grassland throughout England.

Subcommunities

There are two subcommunities:
 the Dactylis glomerata - Briza media subcommunity
 the Potentilla reptans - Tragopogon pratensis subcommunity

References

 Rodwell, J. S. (1992) British Plant Communities Volume 3 - Grasslands and montane communities  (hardback),  (paperback)

CG06